Milagros Naiquén Díaz (born 12 April 2000) is an Argentine footballer who plays as a midfielder for River Plate and the Argentina women's national team.

International career
On 1 September 2019, Díaz appeared in a match against Costa Rica, which finished as a 1–3 loss. She was the captain of the national team during the U20 South American tournament in 2020.

National career 
She played as a midfielder in Gimnasia y Esgrima de La Plata between 2018 and 2022. She played 75 games and scored 32 goals.

References

2000 births
Living people
Women's association football midfielders
Argentine women's footballers
Sportspeople from Buenos Aires Province
Argentina women's international footballers
Villa San Carlos (women) footballers
Gimnasia y Esgrima de La Plata (women) footballers